Trevor Robert Stegman (born 25 June 1946) was a rugby union player who represented Australia.

Stegman, a centre, was born in Sydney and claimed a total of 2 international rugby caps for Australia.

References

Australian rugby union players
Australia international rugby union players
1946 births
Living people
Rugby union centres
Rugby union players from Sydney